Puthiyangadi is a suburb of Kozhikode city between Pavangad, Kozhikode and West Hill Kerala, India.

Transportation
The national highway passes through Puthiyangadi junction. Goa and Mumbai can be accessed on the northern side and Cochin and Thiruvananthapuram can be accessed on the southern side.  Wayanad road connects to Mysore and Bangalore.  The nearest railway station is Calicut on Mangalore-Palakkad line. 
Trains are available to almost all parts of India subject to advance booking over the internet.  There are airports at Kannur, Mangalore and Calicut. All of them are international airports but direct flights are available only to Middle Eastern countries.

Suburbs of Puthiyangadi
 Pavangad
 Kunduparamba
 Koya Road
 Palakkada Road
 Paramel VK Road
 Puthiyappa Harbour
Parakkattil
Athanikkal

Important Landmarks

 Cheenadath Palli
 Alharamain English School, Kunduparamba
 Puthiyangadi Juma Masjidh
 All India Radio, Kunduparamba
 Radio Mango (First Private Radio Station in Kerala)
 Varakkal Makham
 M.E.S Raja Residential School
 Puthiyappa Temple
 Theruvath Juma Masjid
 Nissan Car Showroom.
 Hardly Davidson Bike Showroom
 Hyundai, Volkswagen, Honda, Royal Enfield, Benz Showrooms.
Puthiyapurayil House, near Moideen Palli.
Bismi Furniture
Ayyan's World (All kerala Fireworks Distributor).
Edakkad Subrahmania kshethram
 Milma wholesale, Milma Naalkavala offering all Milma products at cheap rates at Aboobakerz Building which also provides Ev charging
Vighneswara stores
 Manchotil Garden, full fledged garden nursery and plant growth manure and fertilizers

See also
 Pazhayangadi
 Ettammal

Location 

Suburbs of Kozhikode